Duckea is a group of plants in the family Rapateaceae described as a genus in 1958.

The genus is endemic to South America.

 Species
 Duckea cyperaceoidea (Ducke) Maguire - SE Colombia, S Venezuela (Amazonas), N Brazil (Pará, Amazonas)
 Duckea flava (Link) Maguire - SE Colombia, S Venezuela (Amazonas), N Brazil (Amazonas)
 Duckea junciformis Maguire -  SE Colombia (Vaupés), S Venezuela (Amazonas)
 Duckea squarrosa (Willd. ex Link) Maguire -  S Venezuela (Amazonas, Bolívar),  N Brazil (Amazonas)

References

Poales genera
Rapateaceae
Flora of South America